Sahlabad (also Romanized as Sahlābād; also known as Şaleḩābād and Sālīhābād) is a village in Moshkabad Rural District, in the Central District of Arak County, Markazi Province, Iran. At the 2006 census, its population was 693, in 165 families.

References 

Populated places in Arak County